The Treaty of Aberconwy was signed on the 10th of November 1277, the treaty was by King Edward I of England and Llewelyn the Last, Prince of Wales, following Edward’s invasion of Llewelyn’s territories earlier that year. The treaty granted peace between the two but also essentially guaranteed that Welsh self-rule would end upon Llewelyn's death and represented the completion of the first stage of the Conquest of Wales by Edward I.

Background

Llewelyn, wanting to cement his links to royalty more forcefully, sought to marry Eleanor de Montfort, daughter of Simon de Montfort and King Edward's cousin.  They were married by proxy in 1275, but when Eleanor sailed from France to meet Llewelyn, Edward hired pirates to seize her ship; she was imprisoned at Windsor Castle.

Edward, who was newly acceded to the throne of England, viewed Llewelyn as a threat, and particularly disliked the idea of his marrying the daughter of de Montfort, who had been the biggest threat to his royal predecessor's reign.  Edward also summoned Llewelyn to appear before him on several occasions, which Llewelyn refused on the grounds that he was not safe at Edward's court.

In 1276, Edward declared Llewelyn a rebel and gathered an enormous army to march against him.  By the summer of 1277, Edward's forces had reached the heart of Gwynedd.  Edward's men confiscated the harvest in Anglesey, which deprived Llewelyn and his men of food, forcing Llewelyn to surrender.

Treaty
What resulted was the treaty of Aberconwy, which guaranteed peace in Gwynedd in return for several difficult concessions from Llewelyn, including confining his authority to lands west of the River Conwy, while lands east were granted to his brother Dafydd ap Gruffydd, with whom he had earlier fought for control of Wales.  Llewelyn was not stripped of his recently proclaimed title, Prince of Wales – but most of the lesser Welsh rulers who had paid him fealty were no longer to recognize him as their lord.  Once signed, Edward began building several fortresses along the approach to Gwynedd, at Aberystwyth, Builth, Flint and Rhuddlan. The Treaty was agreed 9 November 1277, ratified by Edward 10 November 1277.

Consequences
In the years after the treaty, Llewelyn sought to consolidate what power he had left.  He paid homage and tribute to Edward, who agreed to allow Llewelyn's marriage to go forward.  In 1278, Llewelyn and Eleanor de Montfort were married in Worcester Cathedral, with Edward present at the nuptials.

See also
List of treaties

References

1277 in England
13th century in Wales
Peace treaties
Treaties of Wales
1270s treaties
Peace treaties of England
Treaties of medieval England
1277 in Wales
England–Wales relations